Trypiti is a small town in the island of Milos, Greece (400 citizens). It is famous for being located next to the Milos Catacombs (the Milos Catacombs, not to confused with the Paris Catacombs) and the Roman theatre.

Populated places in Milos (regional unit)
Milos